Group Therapy may refer to:

Group psychotherapy, a form of psychotherapy 
Group Therapy (Above & Beyond album) (2011)
Group Therapy (Alter Natives album) (1988)
Group Therapy (Concrete Blonde album) (2002)
Group Therapy (Dope album) (2003)
New York Jazz Sextet: Group Therapy (1966)
Group Therapy (Sivion album)